Richard III of England (1452–1485) King of England from 26 June 1483 until his death on 22 August 1485.

Richard III may also refer to:

People
 Richard III, Duke of Normandy (997–1027)
 Richard III of Capua (died 1120)
 Richard III of Gaeta (died 1140)

Literature
 Richard III (play), a play by William Shakespeare
 Richard III (1699 play), a play by Colley Cibber
 Richard III (1852 play), a Shakespeare-inspired French play by Victor Séjour
 Richard III (biography), a 1955 biography of the English king by Paul Murray Kendall

Film and television
 Richard III (1912 film), with Frederick Warde
 Richard III (1955 film), with Laurence Olivier, Ralph Richardson and John Gielgud
 III. Richárd (1973 film), a Hungarian television film by György Fehér
 Richard III (1982 film), a Soviet Union film with Ramaz Chkhikvadze
 The Tragedy of Richard III (1983 film), part of BBC Television Shakespeare
 Richard III (1986 film), a French film with Ariel García Valdés; see Cultural depictions of Richard III of England
 Richard III (1995 film), with Ian McKellen and Annette Bening
 Richard III (2007 film), a crime drama film
 Richard III (2015 film), a French-German television film with Lars Eidinger
 Richard III (2016 film), a British television film

Music
 "Richard III" (song), a 1997 song by Supergrass